The term hardwood is used to describe wood from non-monocot angiosperm trees.  It can also refer to:

 Hardwood flooring
 (slang) A Basketball court
 Hardwood (film), a 2004 documentary film
 Hardwood Records, a Canadian record label
 Hardwood Classics, a television series
 Hardwood timber production

Hardwood should not be confused with the term 'heartwood'.